The Gilbert Martinez Barn near Los Ojos, New Mexico was built around 1875.  It was listed on the National Register of Historic Places in 1985.

It is a hewn horizontal log barn with double box notching, with a corrugated metal roof and vertical planks in its gable end.

It is significant as a "little-modified, traditional Hispanic barn, constructed about 1875. The extensive use of hewn logs, even for the loft cross beams and attic walls, suggests that
they are reused from Fort Lowell which stood nearby. A tree ring sample has been taken and the building may well prove pivotal in the chronology of local log construction and in the introduction of the attic wall."

References

Barns in New Mexico		
National Register of Historic Places in Rio Arriba County, New Mexico
Buildings and structures completed in 1875